David Fleurival (born 19 February 1984) is a Guadeloupean international footballer who plays as a defensive midfielder for Luxembourgish club Rodange 91.

Club career
He has played at Tours FC where he was the team captain and in Portugal with Boavista F.C.

International career
Fleurival made his debut for Guadeloupe at the CONCACAF Gold Cup Finals in June 2007 against Haiti. He also played at the 2008 Caribbean Cup.

References

External links
 
 

1984 births
Living people
People from Vitry-sur-Seine
French footballers
Guadeloupean footballers
Tours FC players
Boavista F.C. players
R.A.E.C. Mons players
LB Châteauroux players
FC Metz players
S.C. Beira-Mar players
Chamois Niortais F.C. players
Zawisza Bydgoszcz players
Athlitiki Enosi Larissa F.C. players
RWS Bruxelles players
FC Differdange 03 players
Ligue 2 players
Primeira Liga players
Ekstraklasa players
2007 CONCACAF Gold Cup players
2009 CONCACAF Gold Cup players
2011 CONCACAF Gold Cup players
Expatriate footballers in Portugal
Expatriate footballers in Belgium
Expatriate footballers in Poland
French people of Guadeloupean descent
Guadeloupe international footballers
Association football midfielders
Footballers from Val-de-Marne